Cat Mountain (also Mao'er Mountains) is a mountain located in Taining County, Sanming, Fujian in the People's Republic of China. Its elevation is 516 m.

References

Mountains of Fujian
Landforms of Fujian